The 2009–10 Bill Beaumont Cup (Rugby Union County Championship) was the 110th edition of England's County Championship rugby union club competition. 

Lancashire won their 20th title after defeating Gloucestershire in the final.

Final

See also
 English rugby union system
 Rugby union in England

References

Rugby Union County Championship
County Championship (rugby union) seasons